The 1961 BC Lions finished the season in fifth place in the Western Conference with a disappointing 1–13–2 record and failed to make the playoffs. 

There was, however, a bright side to the season as fundamental building blocks were in place. In the off-season, the Lions signed Linebacker/Guard Tom Brown who would become an important part of the Lions' defense. On August 24, the Lions traded four players to Calgary for Quarterback Joe Kapp and while the results were not immediate they would prove to be critical in future seasons. 

Due to the poor record and play, fan attendance dropped drastically, as the Lions averaged 24,000 fans per game. It also cost head coach Wayne Robinson his job as he was fired after winless first seven games in favour of Dave Skrien on September 12th.

This was also the first season that the CFL introduced inter-conference games, with the first regular season games against the Ottawa Rough Riders, Hamilton Tiger-Cats, Montreal Alouettes and Toronto Argonauts coming in 1961.

Regular season

Season standings

Season schedule

Offensive leaders

1961 CFL Awards
None

References

BC Lions seasons
1961 Canadian Football League season by team
1961 in British Columbia